The 2015 South Somerset District Council election took place on 7 May 2015 to elect members of South Somerset District Council in Somerset, England. This is on the same day as the general election, and other local elections. This election saw 29 Liberal Democrats, 28 Conservatives, and 3 Independents elected to the Council.

The Liberal Democrats have had control of the council since 1987 and won the previous election in 2011 with a 2-seat majority.

Candidates by Ward
South Somerset District Council continued to be made up of 60 councillors elected across 39 wards. The Conservative Party and the Liberal Democrats both fielded 58 candidates, Labour fielded 31 candidates, the Green Party 11, the UK Independence Party 8 and there were 5 independents.

Incumbent candidates are denoted *.

Blackdown Ward
Seats contested: 1

Blackmoor Vale Ward
Seats contested: 2

Bruton Ward
Seats contested: 1

Brympton Ward
Seats contested: 2

Burrow Hill Ward
Seats contested: 1

Camelot Ward
Seats contested: 1

Cary Ward
Seats contested: 2

Chard Avishayes Ward
Seats contested: 1

Chard Combe Ward
Seats contested: 1

Chard Crimchard Ward
Seats contested: 1

Chard Holyrood Ward
Seats contested: 1
}

Chard Jocelyn Ward
Seats contested: 1

Coker Ward
Seats contested: 2

Crewkerne Ward
Seats contested: 3

Curry Rivel Ward
Seats contested: 1

Eggwood Ward
Seats contested: 1

Hamdon Ward
Seats contested: 1

Ilminster Ward
Seats contested: 2

Islemoor Ward
Seats contested: 1

Ivelchester Ward
Seats contested: 1

Langport and Huish Ward
Seats contested: 1

Martock Ward
Seats contested: 2

Milborne Port Ward
Seats contested: 1

Neroche Ward
Seats contested: 1

Northstone Ward
Seats contested: 1

Parrett Ward
Seats contested: 1

South Petherton Ward
Seats contested: 2

St. Michael's Ward
Seats contested: 1

Tatworth and Forton Ward
Seats contested: 1

Tower Ward
Seats contested: 1

Turn Hill Ward
Seats contested: 1

Wessex Ward
Seats contested: 2

Wincanton Ward
Seats contested: 2

Windwhistle Ward
Seats contested: 1

Yeovil Central Ward
Seats contested: 3

Yeovil East Ward
Seats contested: 3

Yeovil South Ward
Seats contested: 3

Yeovil West Ward
Seats contested: 3

Yeovil Without Ward
Seats contested: 3

References

2015
2010s in Somerset
2015 English local elections
May 2015 events in the United Kingdom